George Riddle Banta, Sr. (July 16, 1857 – September 23, 1935) was the founder of the George Banta Company (later the Banta Corporation) and an influential figure in the development of the collegiate Phi Delta Theta fraternity and Delta Gamma women's fraternity.

Biography
Born in Covington, Kentucky, Banta attended Franklin College in Franklin, Indiana, where he became an active member of Phi Delta Theta. After graduating in 1876, he was admitted to the Indiana bar in 1878. He moved to Menasha, Wisconsin, around 1885, where in 1901 he established the George Banta Printing Company. He remained active in the management of the company until his death on September 23, 1935.

Much of the company's early growth came from educational contracts. George Banta, a member of Phi Delta Theta, secured a contract to print its national magazine. Other national fraternities and sororities followed; the company would also publish Banta's Greek Exchange, a monthly review of fraternity and sorority news, and several editions of Baird's Manual of American College Fraternities. His father, David Demaree Banta (1833-1896), was a trustee of Indiana University in Bloomington and was the first dean of its School of Law. Through this connection, the company also won orders for university catalogs and yearbooks, textbooks, and magazines.

Banta served as alderman (1890–1891), and mayor (1892, 1895, 1902–1903) of Menasha, and served on the boards of several local companies.

Banta was married to Lillian Vawter in 1882 and had two sons and a daughter. Both sons became Phi Delts, and his daughter became a Delta Gamma.

He died at age 78 in 1935 in Menasha, and was buried at Oak Hill Cemetery in Neenah.

His former home, known as the George, Sr., and Ellen Banta House, is listed on the National Register of Historic Places.

Greek system involvement
Banta served as national historian of Phi Delta Theta, and was highly instrumental in that society's expansion to new campuses. For his contributions, he is recognized as one of two "Second Founders" of Phi Delt, along with Walter B. Palmer.

Banta was instrumental in establishing the first Delta Gamma chapter outside the Southern United States, at his alma mater. The chapter was designated the "Phi" in honor of Phi Delta Theta, and Banta was made an honorary member—the only man ever initiated into the women's fraternity.

Banta also encouraged the formation of new Greek letter organizations. Emily Butterfield, a co-founder of Alpha Gamma Delta contracted as a designer for the company, is credited as designer or co-designer of the coats of arms of Alpha Gamma Delta, Lambda Omega, Phi Beta, Sigma Delta Rho, Sigma Tau Gamma, Tau Kappa Epsilon, Theta Kappa Nu, Theta Phi Alpha, Theta Upsilon Omega, and Zeta Tau Alpha. He also encouraged her to publish articles she had compiled concerning fraternity and sorority heraldry, released in 1931 as College Fraternity Heraldry. Furthermore, he was elected an honorary member of the Alpha chapter of Phi Mu Alpha Sinfonia fraternity, the national fraternity for men in music, at the New England Conservatory on December 20, 1917.

References

External links

1857 births
1935 deaths
American printers
Phi Delta Theta
People from Menasha, Wisconsin
Mayors of places in Wisconsin
Wisconsin city council members
Franklin College (Indiana) alumni
Politicians from Covington, Kentucky
Burials in Wisconsin